Waly is a village and a commune in the Meuse department in Grand Est in north-eastern France. It is the only village in the commune.

The Church of St. Catherine in Waly was consecrated September 26, 1897 by the Bishop of Verdun. In Gothic Revival style, the building contains some carved furniture. The church is disproportionately large, considering the small size of the village.

Population

See also
Communes of the Meuse department

References

Communes of Meuse (department)